Mattermost is an open-source, self-hostable online chat service with file sharing, search, and integrations. It is designed as an internal chat for organisations and companies, and mostly markets itself as an open-source alternative to Slack and Microsoft Teams.

History 

The code was originally proprietary, as Mattermost was used as an internal chat tool inside SpinPunch, a game developer studio, but was later open-sourced. The 1.0 was released on October 2, 2015.

The project is maintained and developed by Mattermost Inc. The company generates funds by selling support services and additional features that aren't in the open-source edition.

It was also integrated into GitLab as "GitLab Mattermost", although in 2017 GitLab acquired Gitter, another popular chat tool, but in 2021 GitLab sold Gitter to Element, the parent company of Matrix.

Features 

In the media, Mattermost is mostly regarded as an alternative to the more popular Slack. Aside from the in-browser version, there are desktop clients for Windows, MacOS and Linux and mobile apps for iOS and Android.

As of version 6.0 Mattermost includes kanban board and playbook features integrated in main interface.

Adoption 
Mattermost has been tested for community use by Wikimedia as Wikimedia Chat on Wikimedia Cloud Services as of late summer 2020.

Among other adopters, companies having adopted Mattermost include CERN with a reported "10,000 monthly active users" having chosen Mattermost under the reasoning “didn’t want to use another service that locked in our data”, and the U.S. Department of Defense.

See also 
 List of collaborative software

References

External links 
 

2015 software
Communication software
Go (programming language) software
Groupware
Instant messaging
Instant messaging clients
JavaScript software
Open-source cloud applications